Gan Yoshiya (lit. Josiah's Garden) is a moshav in central Israel. Located near the Green Line in the Tulkarm area, it falls under the jurisdiction of Hefer Valley Regional Council.

History
The moshav was founded on 6 December 1949 on the land of the depopulated Palestinian village of Qaqun by demobilised Palmach soldiers and Jewish immigrants from Romania. It was initially named Nahal Reuven after Nabi Rubin, before being later renamed in honour of Josiah Wedgwood.

References

External links
Official website

Moshavim
Populated places established in 1949
Populated places in Central District (Israel)
Romanian-Jewish culture in Israel
1949 establishments in Israel